Heian dai shogi ( 'Heian (Era) large chess') is an early large board variant of shogi (Japanese chess) as it was played in the Heian period.  The same 12th century document which describes the Heian form of shogi also describes this variant.  Unfortunately, this description does not give enough information to actually play the game, but this has not stopped people from attempting to reconstruct this early form of shogi.  A fairly complete and playable reconstruction is outlined here.

Rules of the game

Objective 

The objective of the game is to capture your opponent's king or to capture all the other pieces, leaving a bare king. Unlike standard shogi, pieces may not be dropped back into play after capture.

Game equipment 

Two players, Black and White (or 先手 sente and 後手 gote), play on a board ruled into a grid of 13 ranks (rows) by 13 files (columns) for a total of 169 squares.  The squares are undifferentiated by marking or color.

Each player has a set of 34 wedge-shaped pieces of 13 different types.  In all, the players must remember 13 different moves.  The pieces are of slightly different sizes. From largest to smallest (most to least powerful) they are:

 1 king
 2 flying dragons
 2 gold generals
 2 silver generals
 1 side mover
 2 copper generals
 2 iron generals
 2 fierce tigers
 2 free chariots
 1 go between
 2 knights
 2 lances
 13 pawns

Many of the English names were chosen to correspond to rough equivalents in Western chess, rather than as translations of the Japanese names.

Each piece has its name in the form of two kanji written on its face. On the reverse side of each piece (other than kings and gold generals) are one or two other characters, often in a different color (e.g., red instead of black); this reverse side is turned up to indicate that the piece has been promoted during play. The pieces of the two sides do not differ in color, but instead each piece is shaped like a wedge, and faces forward, toward the opposing side. This shows who controls the piece during play.

Setup 

Each side places his pieces in the positions shown below, pointing toward the opponent.

 In the rank nearest the player:
 The king is placed in the center file.
 The two gold generals are placed in the adjacent files to the king.
 The two silver generals are placed adjacent to each gold general.
 The two copper generals are placed adjacent to each silver general.
 The two iron generals are placed adjacent to each copper general.
 The two knights are placed adjacent to each iron general.
 The two lances are placed in the corners, adjacent to each knight.

That is, the first rank is 

or

 In the second rank, each player places:
 The side mover in the same file as the king.
 The fierce tigers in the same files as the silver generals.
 The flying dragons in the same files as the knights
 The free chariots in the same files as the lances.
 In the third rank, the thirteen pawns are placed one in each file.
 In the fourth rank, the go between is placed in the same file as the side mover.

Game play 

Two players alternate in making a move, with Black moving first. (The pieces are not differentiated by color; the traditional chess terms "Black" and "White" are only used to indicate who plays first, and to differentiate the sides during discussions of the game.) A move consists of moving a piece either to an empty square on the board or to a square occupied by an opposing piece, thus displacing (capturing) that piece; and optionally of promoting the moving piece, if its move enters the promotion zone.

Movement and capture 

An opposing piece is captured by displacement: That is, if a piece moves to a square occupied by an opposing piece, the opposing piece is displaced and removed from the board. A piece cannot move to a square occupied by a friendly piece, that is, by another piece controlled by the moving player.

Each piece on the game moves in a characteristic pattern. Pieces move either orthogonally (that is, forward, backward, left, or right, in the direction of one of the arms of a plus sign, +), or diagonally (in the direction of one of the arms of a multiplication sign, ×). The knight is an exception in that it does not move in a straight line.

If a piece that cannot retreat or move aside advances across the board until it can no longer move, it must promote. This applies to the pawn, lance and knight upon reaching the furthest rank.  

Some pieces are capable of several kinds of movement, with the type of movement most often depending on the direction in which they move. The movement categories are:

Step movers

Some pieces move only one square at a time. (If a friendly piece occupies an adjacent square, the moving piece may not move in that direction; if an opposing piece is there, it may be displaced and captured.)

The step movers are the king, generals, fierce tiger, go between and the 13 pawns on each side.

Jumping piece

The knight can jump, that is, it can pass over any intervening piece, whether friend or foe, with no effect on either.

Ranging pieces

Many pieces can move any number of empty squares along a straight orthogonal or diagonal line, limited only by the edge of the board. If an opposing piece intervenes, it may be captured by moving to that square and removing it from the board. A ranging piece must stop where it captures, and cannot bypass a piece that is in its way. If a friendly piece intervenes, the moving piece is limited to a distance that stops short of the intervening piece; if the friendly piece is adjacent, it cannot move in that direction at all.

The ranging pieces are the flying dragon, side mover, free chariot and lance.

Promotion 

The promotion zone is the 'enemy camp', the farthest three ranks of the board, which are mostly occupied by the opposing player's pieces when the board is first set up. When a promotable piece enters the promotion zone, it has the option of "promoting" to a more powerful rank. Promotion is effected by turning the piece over after it moves, revealing the name of its promoted rank. The characters inscribed on the backs of the pieces to indicate promoted rank may be in red ink. Promotion is not mandatory if the unpromoted piece could move further on a later turn, and in some cases it may be beneficial to leave the piece unpromoted; however, there may be restrictions on whether the piece can promote again later. (The rule in the later chu shogi would always allow promotion on captures that touch the promotion zone, but would only allow promotion on a non-capture if the piece exited the promotion zone and then reentered.) Promotion is permanent and promoted pieces may not revert to their original rank. All pieces in Heian dai shogi promote to a gold general.

If a pawn, knight or lance reaches the furthest rank without promoting, it can no longer promote and has no legal move on subsequent turns.

Individual pieces

Following are diagrams that indicate the movement of each piece. Pieces are listed roughly in order, from nearest to furthest rows. Betza's funny notation has been included in brackets for easier reference.

It should be noted to players of chu shogi and dai shogi that the copper general and iron general move differently in this game from how they move in the other two games. Here they have the move of the angry boar (wazir) and evil wolf respectively. The side mover and flying dragon are also different (the latter has the move of the bishop, and its promoted version has the move of the dragon horse).

Check and mate 

When a player makes a move such that the opponent's king could be captured on the following move, the move is said to give check to the king; the king is said to be in check. If a player's king is in check and no legal move by that player will get it out of check, the checking move is also mate, and effectively wins the game.

A player is not allowed to give perpetual check.

Game end 

A player who captures the opponent's king or all the other pieces (bare king) wins the game unless the opponent’s bare king can bare the player’s king on the next move, in which case the game is a draw.  In practice this winning condition rarely happens, as a player will resign when checkmated, as otherwise when loss is inevitable.

A player who makes an illegal move loses immediately. (This rule may be relaxed in casual games.)

There is one other possible (but fairly uncommon) ways for a game to end: repetition (千日手 sennichite). If the same position occurs four times with the same player to play, then the game is no contest. (Recall, however, the prohibition against perpetual check.)

Game notation 

The method used in English-language texts to express shogi moves was established by George Hodges in 1976. It is derived from the algebraic notation used for chess, but modifications have been made for heian dai shogi.

A typical example is P-8f.
The first letter represents the piece moved: P = pawn, L = lance, N = knight, GB = go between, FC = free chariot, FT = fierce tiger, I = iron, C = copper, SM = side mover, S = silver, G = gold, FD = flying dragon, K = king.  Promoted pieces have a + added in front of the letter, for example +P for a promoted pawn.  The designation of the piece is followed by a symbol indicating the type of move: - for an ordinary move or x for a capture.  Next is the designation for the square on which the piece lands.  This consists of a number representing the file and a lowercase letter representing the rank, with 1a being the top right corner (as seen from Black's point of view) and 13m being the bottom left corner.  (This method of designating squares is based on Japanese convention, which, however, uses Japanese numerals instead of letters. For example, the square 2c is denoted by 2三 in Japanese.)

If a move entitles the player to promote the piece, then a + is added to the end to signify that the promotion was taken, or an = to indicate that it was declined.
For example, Nx7c= indicates a knight capturing on 7c without promoting.

In cases where the above notation would be ambiguous, the designation of the start square is added after the designation for the piece in order to make clear which piece is meant.

Moves are commonly numbered as in chess.

See also 
 Shogi variant
 Heian shogi
 Wa shogi
 Chu shogi
 Dai shogi
 Tenjiku shogi
 Dai dai shogi
 Maka dai dai shogi
 Tai shogi
 Taikyoku shogi

External links 
 Shogi Net
 Chessvariants.org/heian dai shogi

Shogi variants